The Arleigh Burke Fleet Trophy is an award presented annually by the United States Navy to the ship or aviation squadron that demonstrates the greatest improvement in battle efficiency from the previous year. Two commands annually, one from each coast earn the award.

History
Admiral Arleigh Burke was a distinguished naval officer for over 38 years. His leadership and contribution to Naval warfare are embodied by this award. Arleigh Burke made vital contributions in many key warfare areas including battle efficiency, new tactical
concepts, and weapons systems. The award recognizes an outstanding improvement in battle efficiency. The trophy is a plaque adorned with a profile of Admiral Burke himself.

Winners

References 

Awards and decorations of the United States Navy